Abdullah Al Mahmood (1900–1975) was a Bengali politician and lawyer who served as the Minister of Industries and Natural Resources of Pakistan.

Early life and education
Abdullah al Mahmood was born on 4 April 1900, to a Bengali Muslim family of Taluqdars in the village of Koyelgati in Sheyalkol Union, Sirajganj which was formerly in Pabna District, Bengal Presidency. His father's name was Derazuddin Taluqdar.

After passing entrance examinations, Mahmood enrolled at the Carmichael College in Rangpur in 1915. He completed his IA in 1918, and moved on to study at the Calcutta Islamia College from which he graduated with a Bachelor of Arts in Philosophy in 1920. Abdullah al Mahmood then studied at the University of Calcutta's Presidency College where he gained his Bachelor of Laws certificate, and also left with a MA in Arabic.

Career
Abdullah al Mahmood started his career as a lawyer in 1924, joining the Bar and involving himself in social work. He had devoted his life to educational advancement of Bengal province. He was a founding member of Sirajganj College, and was closely associated with almost all the institutions of the district. He was also a member of the Dhaka University Court (since 1940-1951) and member of its Executive Council since 1947. He was Member of the first Syndicate (highest executive body) of Rajshahi University too.
He was the Director of Central Cooperative Bank for years, and appointed the Chairman of Central Cooperative Bank. He was Member of Indian Central Jute Committee. He was Member of Imperial Council of Agricultural Research and its advisory Board (1945-1947). 
His entrance to politics began with serving as a member of the Bengal Legislative Assembly in 1937 and Indian Legislative Council in 1946 for the All-India Muslim League. He was appointed  Parliamentary Secretary of Government of Bengal (Department of Civil Supply, Food Ministry from 1943-1945). A Parliamentary Secretary holds the rank of Minister of State. During this tenure, Hussain Shahid Sharwardy was his Minister and khawaza Sir Nazimuddin was the Prime Minister of undivided Bengal at the time.
In 1942 he was elected assistant secretary of Bengal Provincial Muslim League working Committee and member of all India Muslim league Council at that time Akram Khan was elected president and Hussain Shahid Swarardy was Secretary of Bengal provincial Muslim league. Mr. Mahmood was Assistant Secretary of Bengal Provincial Muslim League from 1942 to 1948.  Mr. Al Mahmood was President of Pabna District Muslim League (1942-1948). He was Member of Pabna District Board. He was Chairman of Sirajgonj Municipality from 1937 to 1949.
  
From 1937 until the Independence of Pakistan on 14 August 1947 he was elected member of Bengal legislative assembly and Bengal Legislative Council  During this period, the British colonial authorities offered him the honorary title of Khan Bahadur but  Mr. Abdullah al Mahmood rejected it as a participant of the non-cooperation movement. Mahmood was also the only elected Bengal Province member at the meeting of the Muslim League Executive Committee in Lucknow. Mahmood represented the constituency of Sirajganj at the Lahore conference on 23 March 1940. In 1942, he was appointed convener of the All-India Muslim League Conference. Mr. Abdullah al Mahmood became the first Indian leader to be appointed chairman of the London-headquartered Imperial Jute Committee in 1945.

Following Pakistan's independence, he served as a member of the 1st National Assembly of Pakistan and in May 1948 he was appointed joint Chief Whip. On 14 November 1948, Mahmood was appointed  the first Deputy High Commissioner of Pakistan in India which he served as until 1952. In 1962 and 1965 respectively, Mahmood became a member of the 3rd and 4th National Assembly of Pakistan. Mahmood was also appointed the Minister of Industries and Natural Resources of Central Pakistan in 1963 which he served up until 1965. He then retired from politics in 1969 due to old age.

Family
Al Mahmood's eldest son Iqbal Hasan Mahmud Tuku served successively as the Bangladeshi State Minister of Power and Agriculture. His daughter the late Tasmina Mahmood was a notable physician and the wife of Deputy Prime Minister of Bangladesh M.A. Matin. His youngest son Manzur Hasan Mahmood Khushi was a former chairman of the Sirajganj Municipality. His eldest daughter was the late Ms. Tahmina Mahmud wife of the late Mahboobur Rahman Chowdhury who served as the Additional secretary in the ministry of education and planning   and his youngest daughter is Ms. Tahsina Morshed wife of Mohammad Golam Morshed who was a lawyer, social worker and former governor of Lions Club International.

Death and legacy
Mr Abdullah al Mahmood died in Sirajganj on 13 June 1975. In Sirajganj, there remains the AL Mahmood  Avenue which was where he used to reside.

References

External links
 Catalog Record: The Times of India directory and year book... | HathiTrust Digital Library https://catalog.hathitrust.org/Record/000682218
 https://books.google.com.bd/books?id=N1_VAAAAMAAJ&q=times+of+india+yearbook+1951+abdullah+al+mahmood&dq=times+of+india+yearbook+1951+abdullah+al+mahmood&hl=en&sa=X&ved=2ahUKEwjm2pfF8M7xAhUAIbcAHd1ZASEQ6AEwAHoECAUQAg
 https://www.facebook.com/1662268940735555/posts/2556551671307273/?d=n
 https://www.facebook.com/1662268940735555/posts/2556962521266188/?d=n

Pakistani MNAs 1947–1954
1900 births
1975 deaths
20th-century Bengalis
Bangladeshi Sunni Muslims
Carmichael College alumni
Maulana Azad College alumni
University of Calcutta alumni
Pakistani MNAs 1962–1965
Pakistani MNAs 1965–1969
People of East Pakistan
Government ministers of Pakistan
People from Sirajganj Sadar Upazila
Bengal MLAs 1937–1945
Members of the Constituent Assembly of Pakistan